The English women's cricket team toured Sri Lanka in 2010, playing a total of two Women's One Day Internationals and three Women's Twenty20 Internationals in the space of eight days.

Touring party
England's touring party was announced in September 2010, with first-choice wicket-keeper Sarah Taylor choosing take some time off from international cricket.  Katherine Brunt and Holly Colvin miss the tour as well to focus on a strength and conditioning programme and to concentrate on University studies. Lauren Griffiths, Beth MacGregor, Susie Rowe and Fran Wilson are called up.

Full touring party:

Charlotte Edwards (captain)
Jenny Gunn
Lydia Greenway 
Lauren Griffiths
Isa Guha
Danielle Hazell
Heather Knight

Beth MacGregor
Laura Marsh
Beth Morgan
Susie Rowe
Anya Shrubsole
Claire Taylor
Fran Wilson
Danielle Wyatt

One Day International series

Twenty20 International series

References

External links
Series page from Cricinfo

Sri Lanka
Women 2010
Sri Lanka 2010
2010 in Sri Lankan cricket
Women's international cricket tours of Sri Lanka
International cricket competitions in 2010–11
2010 in women's cricket